Raman Bishnoi (born 24 December 1997) is an Indian cricketer. He made his first-class debut on 9 December 2019, for Chandigarh in the 2019–20 Ranji Trophy. He made his List A debut on 25 February 2021, for Chandigarh in the 2020–21 Vijay Hazare Trophy.

References

External links
 

1997 births
Living people
Indian cricketers
Chandigarh cricketers
Place of birth missing (living people)